Kilkis is a city in Central Macedonia, Greece. As of 2011 there were 22,914 people living in the city proper, 28,745 people living in the municipal unit, and 51,926 in the municipality of Kilkis. It is also the capital city of the regional unit of Kilkis.

The area of Kilkis, during the 20th century, became several times a war theatre; during the Macedonian Struggle, the Balkan Wars, WWI, WWII, the Greek Resistance and the Greek civil war.

Name
Kilkis is located in a region that was multi-ethnic in the recent past and is known by several different names.  The name of the city in Roman times was Callicum. In the early Byzantine times was called Kallikon, and was also known as Kalkis or Kilkis by the Greeks.  In Bulgarian and Macedonian, it is known as Kukush (Кукуш). In a Greek church Codеx of 1732 it is mentioned as Kilkisi, while in a Slavic church Codеx from 1741 it is mentioned as Kukush (Кукуш, Кукоуш). It was called by the Ottomans: , written  قلقيش) in Ottoman Turkish.

Administration

Municipality

The municipality Kilkis was formed at the 2011 local government reform by the merger of the following 7 former municipalities, that became municipal units:
Cherso
Doirani
Gallikos
Kilkis
Kroussa
Mouries
Pikrolimni

The municipality has an area of 1,599.604 km2, the municipal unit 319.834 km2.

Communities

The municipal unit Kilkis consists of the following communities (settlements):
Kilkis (Kilkis, Argyroupoli, Zacharato, Kolchida, Metalliko, Xirovrysi, Sevasto)
Chorygi
Efkarpia
Kastanies
Kristoni
Leipsydrio (Leipsydrio, Akropotamia, Ano Potamia, Kato Potamia)
Megali Vrysi
Melanthio
Messiano (Mesiano, Dafnochori, Leventochori, Palaio Gynaikokastro)
Stavrochori
Vaptistis (Vaptistis, Kyriakaiika)

Province
The province of Kilkis was one of the provinces of the Kilkis Prefecture. Its territory corresponded with that of the current municipality Kilkis, and the municipal unit Polykastro. It was abolished in 2006.

History

Ancient age

Findings dating back to as early as the Bronze and Iron Age have been excavated in the vicinity of Kilkis, including ancient tombs of the 2nd millennium BC.
In classical antiquity, the wider region of Kilkis was ruled by the kingdom of Macedon. At the time, Kilkis was in the center of a region called Krestonia.  When Philip II of Macedon visited Krestonia, the locals offered him olives from Krestonia valley, something that he had never eaten before. At that time, many towns flourished in the region, such as Idomeni, Atalanti (Axioupoli nowadays), Gortynia (Gorgopi nowadays), Planitsa (Fyska nowadays), Terpillos, Klitae (Xylokeratia nowadays), Vragylos (Metalliko nowadays), Ioron (Palatiano nowadays), Chaetae (Tsaousitsa nowadays), Carabia (Limnotopos nowadays), Bairos (Kastro nowadays), Morrylos (Ano Apostoli nowadays), Doveros (Doirani nowadays), Evropos and Kallindria.

Roman and Byzantine era
In 148 BC, the Romans took over the area.  In late antiquity the area of Kilkis saw invasions of different tribes, such as the Goths, the Huns, the Avars and the Slavs, some of whom gradually settled in the Balkan Peninsula.

In the Middle Ages, Kilkis changed hands several times between the Byzantine and Bulgarian Empires. In the 10th century, it was sacked by the Bulgarians, and some of the inhabitants moved to Calabria, in southern Italy, where they founded the village of Gallicianò. During the reign of the Palaeologus dynasty, the region saw the completion of a number of important infrastructure works.

Ottoman rule
The period of prosperity ended in 1430, when Thessalonica and the entire region of Macedonia came under Ottoman rule. In the first half of the 18th century, Kukush (or Kukosh) was known as a village. After 1850, there was one Greek church, "Panagia tou Kilkis" (Madonna of Kilkis), at the foot of Saint George hill and one Greek school. In 1840–1872 the Bulgarian enlighters Dimitar Miladinov, Andronik Yosifchev, Rayko Zhinzifov and Kuzman Shapkarev were teachers in the local school.

By the mid-19th century Kilkis was a primarily Bulgarian-populated town. According to one estimate, there were about 500 Greeks, 500 Turks and 4500 Bulgarians in the town  at the time. An 1873 Ottoman study concluded that the population of Kilkis consisted of 1,170 households, of which there were 5,235 Bulgarian inhabitants, 155 Muslims and 40 Romani people. Reports and memoranda of Greek agents described Kilkis and the surrounding rural area, deemed of paramount importance for the control of Thessaloniki, as lacking Greek or pro-Greek population, the ethnological basis of Greek claims. A Vasil Kanchov study of 1900 counted 7,000 Bulgarian and 750 Turkish inhabitants in the town. Another survey in 1905 established the presence of 9,712 Exarchists, 40 Patriarchists, 592 Uniate Christians and 16 Protestants.

In the late 19th and early 20th century, Kilkis was part of the Salonica Vilayet of the Ottoman Empire.

In 1893–1908, the Bulgarian inhabitants of the town participated in the activities of Internal Macedonian Revolutionary Organization (IMRO). The leader of IMRO Gotse Delchev was born in Kilkis (Kukush in Bulgarian).

A catalogue of native Macedonians who participated in the Macedonian Struggle ("Greek armed struggle for Macedonia") during 1904–1908 lists five persons originating from Kilkis: Georgios Samaras, Ioannis Doiranlis and Petros Koukidis, who were members of armed bands, and Evangelia Traianou-Tzoukou and Ekaterini Stampouli, as "agents of third order". Great support to the Greek efforts was given by the Chatziapostolou family. The Chatziapostolou family owned a great farm in Metalliko, the field crop of which was almost completely given to fund the Greek efforts. The farm also served a shelter for the Greek fighters.

Balkan Wars, WWI and later

During the First Balkan War of 1912, the Ottoman Empire was defeated by the Balkan League and forced to concede almost all of its European territories, leaving Kilkis within the new boundaries of Bulgaria. In the Second Balkan War of 1913, the Greek army captured the city from the Bulgarians after the three-day Battle of Kilkis-Lahanas between June 19 and June 21. The battle was costly, with over 8,652 casualties on the Greek side and 7,000 on the Bulgarian side. The significance of the Battle of Kilkis-Lahanas can be appreciated by the fact that Greece named a battleship after the city, the Kilkís.  Kilkis was set on fire and almost completely destroyed by the Greek Army after the battle and virtually all of its 13,000 pre-war Bulgarian inhabitants were expelled to Bulgaria. The new town was built closer to the railway tracks to Thessaloniki, around the Greek church of St. George, and was settled by Greeks who were expelled from the Ottoman Empire and Bulgaria, especially from Strumica; they built the Church of the Pentekaídeka Martýrōn ("15 Martyrs", named after the main Patriarchal church in Strumica). The resettled Greeks were so many that Kilkis was temporarily renamed Néa Stromnítsa (New Strumica).

During WWI, the area of Kilkis was again inside the war zone, as part of the Macedonian front.

In the mid-1920s, after the Asia Minor Catastrophe, waves of  refugees came to Kilkis, thus giving a new boost to the region and contributing to the increase of its population. Likewise, the Turks (a generic term for all Muslims, whether of Turkish, Albanian, Greek, or Bulgarian origin) of the region had to leave for the new Turkish state in the exchange of populations. In the aftermath of the Balkan Wars, World War I and the Greco-Turkish War (1919-1922) most of the Turkish and Bulgarian population of Kilkis emigrated, and many Greeks from Bulgaria and Turkey settled in the area, as prescribed by the Treaty of Lausanne. In fact, a very large segment of the population of Kilkis regional unit are in origin Caucasus Greeks (that is, Eastern Pontic Greeks) from the former Russian Imperial province of Kars Oblast in the South Caucasus. They left their homeland in the South Caucasus for Kilkis and other parts of Greek Macedonia, as well as southern Russia and Georgia, between 1919 and 1921, that is, between the main Greece-Turkey population exchange and Russia's cession of the Kars region back to Turkey as part of the Treaty of Brest Litovsk. By 1928, 1,679 refugee families containing 6,433 individuals had been resettled in Kilkis. Barely two decades later, World War II broke out and the region was devastated once again.

World War II

During the occupation of Greece by the Axis Powers in World War II, Kilkis was included in the German zone of occupation, but in 1943 it became part of Bulgarian zone, which was expanded to include the prefectures of Kilkis and Chalkidiki, after the Nazis allowed so. The most significant event during the occupation was the Battle of Kilkis which took place on 4 November 1944 between the communist-led EAM and a coalition of the collaborationist Security Battalions and nationalist resistance organizations.

Culture
Techni Art Association

Economy

Kilkis is an industrialized town. ALUMIL, the largest non-ferrous metal industry in Greece, is based also in Kilkis.

Transport

Road Transport

Kilkis is accessible from the A1 motorway to the intersection of Polykastro and National Highway 65, which passes around the town, connecting it south with Egnatia Road and Highway 25, and north with the Doiranos Customs Office and Doiranos Customs. end of Highway 25, just 10 kilometers from the Promachonos Customs (Greece – Bulgaria border).

The Kilkis is served by KTEL Bus, which performs daily trips to/from Athens, Thessaloniki and other cities within Greece.

Rail Transport
Kilkis has a train station on the Thessaloniki-Alexandroupoli line, with daily services to Thessaloniki and Alexandroupoli.

Air Transport
Kilkis currently does not have an airport; the nearest is Thessaloniki Airport, 66 km away.

Sport teams
Kilkis hosts the football club Kilkisiakos F.C. with earlier presence in 2nd-tier division of Greek championship and the handball club G.A.S. Kilkis which has won a Greek cup.

People
 Sakis Boulas, actor
 Viki Chadjivassiliou, journalist
 Petar Darvingov, officer and military historian
 Stefanos Dedas (born 1982), basketball head coach in the Israel Basketball Premier League
 Gotse Delchev (1872–1903), revolutionary
 Giorgos Floridis (el), politician
 Aristarchos Fountoukidis, footballer
 Valentini Grammatikopoulou, tennis player
 Dimitris Markos, footballer
 Loukas Mavrokefalidis, professional basketball player (1984)
 Hristo Smirnenski (1898–1923), poet 
 Milan Stoilov (1881–1903), writer and revolutionary
 Savvas Tsitouridis, politician, ex-minister
 Konstantinos Vasileiadis, professional basketball player (1984)
 Nikos Vergos, footballer
 Dimitar Vlahov (1878–1953), politician

See also
Gallikos (river)

References

External links 
 Туше Делииванов – "Един Дълг; Лазар в Кукуш", публикуванo во "Кукуш", број 1, Софиja, 24 мај 1924 годинa An article about Kukush(Kilkis) by the Revolutionary Tushe Deliivanov published in "Kukush" magazine in 1924.
 Туше Влахов, Кукуш и неговото историческо минало, истор. очерк. изд. Софија, 1969. – History of the town of Kukush by the Kukush native Tushe Vlahov
 Kilkis Tourist Guide
 Kilkistoday.gr – Online news for Kilkis

 
Greek prefectural capitals
Municipalities of Central Macedonia
Provinces of Greece
Roman towns and cities in Greece
Populated places in Kilkis (regional unit)